The 17th Legislative Assembly of Puerto Rico was the 17th session of the Puerto Rican legislature that met from January 14, 2013 until January 1, 2017. All members of the House of Representatives and the Senate were elected in the General Elections of 2012. The House and the Senate both had a majority of members from the Popular Democratic Party (PPD).

The house sessions are composed by the 25th Senate of Puerto Rico and the 29th House of Representatives of Puerto Rico.

Leadership

Senate

House of Representatives

Members

Senate

House

17